Marxist Communist Party of India, MCPI was a political party in India that formed in 1983 under the leadership of comrade Mohan Punamia. It emerged as a splinter group of Communist Party of India (Marxist) stuck to the original 1964 programme. The party general secretary was Jagjit Singh Lyallpuri (former All India Kisan Sabha general secretary).

MCPI was active in Andhra Pradesh, Bihar, Punjab, West Bengal, Rajasthan, Tamil Nadu, Uttar Pradesh, etc.

In 2005 by the unification of the Marxist Communist Party of India, the Mangat Ram Pasla-led breakaway group from the CPI(M) in Punjab – Communist Party Marxist (Punjab), the BTR-EMS-AKG Janakeeya Vedi (a Kerala-based splintergroup of the CPI(M), which had been based in the CITU) and the Hardan Roy group in West Bengal and formed Marxist Communist Party of India (United).

Principal class mass organizations
 All India Centre of Trade Unions (AICTU)
 All India Kisaan Federation (AIKF)
 All India Agricultural Workers Federation (AIAWF)
 All India Federation of Democratic Youth (AIFDY)
 All India Federation of Democratic Women (AIFDW)
 All India Federation of Democratic Students (AIFDS)

Ahead of the 2004 Lok Sabha elections MCPI participated in the front initiated by Communist Party of India (Marxist-Leninist) Red Flag and Communist Party of India (Marxist-Leninist).

In 2005 MCPI merged with other splinter groups to form the Marxist Communist Party of India (United).

Lok Sabha election results:
2004: 4 candidates from Andhra Pradesh,
1999: 7 candidates from Andhra Pradesh, in total 120,220 votes
1998: 2 candidates from Andhra Pradesh, in total 24,417 votes
1996: 2 candidates from Andhra Pradesh, in total 33,900 votes
1991: 4 candidates from Andhra Pradesh, 1 from West Bengal, in total 43,085 votes
1989: 3 candidates from Andhra Pradesh, in total 100,300 votes

State assembly elections
Andhra Pradesh 1999: 74 candidates, in total 132,601 votes
Bihar 2000: 6 candidates, 8,861 votes
Rajasthan 2003: 1 candidate, 2,111 votes
Rajasthan 1998: 2 candidates, in total 542 votes
West Bengal 2001: 1 candidate, 2,014 votes

References

Defunct communist parties in India
Communist Party of India (Marxist) breakaway groups
Political parties established in 1983
1983 establishments in India
Political parties disestablished in 2005
2005 disestablishments in India
Marxist Communist Party of India (United)